"I'll Be There" is a song by the band CHIC featuring Nile Rodgers. It was produced by Rodgers and Bernard Edwards. It was intended to be the lead single for the band's album It's About Time, but due to the deaths of Prince and David Bowie, the album changed over the following years. Since Rodgers is the act's founder and only original member, he received billing credit on the song.

Song background
The single pays tribute to the disco era and makes references to Chic-related songs and artists produced by the group. Among the referenced tracks (and acts) mentioned and sampled:
"Got To Love Somebody" by Sister Sledge (using the song's multiple elements)
"Everybody Dance" (sampled vocal lyrics)
"Good Times" (sampled vocal lyrics)
"We Are Family" by Sister Sledge (Sound effects from the extended version)

Chart performance
The song reached number one on Billboard's Hot Dance Club Songs chart in its June 20, 2015 issue, and was the act's fourth number one overall, and their first number-one single in nearly 23 years when "Chic Mystique" peaked at number one, in 1992.

Weekly charts

Year-end charts

See also
 List of number-one dance singles of 2015 (U.S.)

References

External links
Official Video (US version) on YouTube

2015 singles
Chic (band) songs
Number-one singles in Israel
Dance-pop songs
Electronic songs
House music songs
2014 songs
Songs written by Nile Rodgers
Songs written by Bernard Edwards
Warner Records singles